Rochelle "Rocky" Clark,  (born 29 May 1981) is an English rugby union player for Saracens. She represented  at the 2006, 2010, 2014 and 2017 Women's Rugby World Cup tournaments.

Clark earned her 50th cap at the 2010 Women's Rugby World Cup which made her 's second most-capped player at the time.

She was appointed Member of the Order of the British Empire (MBE) in the 2015 New Year Honours for services to rugby.

As of 16 March 2018, Clark has 137 caps. She was the most capped player in England international history, including both men and women, surpassing Jason Leonard's men's record of 114, until Sarah Hunter received her 138th cap at the 2021 Women's Rugby World Cup

She credits hot baths and hard work as reasons for her success. She is a PT and rugby coach, and in her spare time is developing her media career. She regularly delivers motivational speeches at rugby clubs and after-dinner talks. Clark has a passion for coffee and taking her dog out for walks.

Clark is currently forwards coach at Saracens ladies' rugby club . She aspires to coach at the top level in both club and international rugby, having gained her level 4 qualification in 2019. She also coaches the Buckinghamshire u16 Girls DPP.

References

External links
Rochelle 'Rocky' Clark's official website
English Player Profile
http://www.warriors.co.uk/valkyries/players/index.php?player=110723&includeref=dynamic

1981 births
Living people
England women's international rugby union players
English female rugby union players
Female rugby union players
Members of the Order of the British Empire